Mehdi El Ghazouani (born 30 March 1976) is a retired Moroccan long jumper.

He won the silver medal at the 1995 African Junior Championships, and the bronze medal at the 2000 African Championships behind compatriot Younès Moudrik and Egyptian Hatem Mersal. He also competed at the 2000 Olympic Games without reaching the final. He became Moroccan long jump champion in 1995, 1996, 1998, 1999 and 2000. He also became triple jump champion in 1996 as well as 100 and 200 metres double champion in 1997.

His personal best jump is 7.96 metres, achieved in July 1999 in Casablanca.

References

1976 births
Living people
Moroccan male long jumpers
Athletes (track and field) at the 2000 Summer Olympics
Olympic athletes of Morocco
20th-century Moroccan people